Schwadron is a surname. Notable people with the surname include: 

Avraham Schwadron
Ernst Schwadron, Austrian architect and interior designer
Harley Schwadron, American cartoonist
Joshua Schwadron (born 1981), American lawyer and entrepreneur
Sholom Mordechai Schwadron (1835–1911), rabbi
Sholom Schwadron (1912–1997), rabbi and orator